The High-Z Supernova Search Team was an international cosmology collaboration which used Type Ia supernovae to chart the expansion of the universe. The team was formed in 1994 by Brian P. Schmidt, then a post-doctoral research associate at Harvard University, and Nicholas B. Suntzeff, a staff astronomer at the Cerro Tololo Inter-American Observatory (CTIO) in Chile. The original team first proposed for the research on September 29, 1994 in a proposal called A Pilot Project to Search for Distant Type Ia Supernova to the CTIO. The original team as co-listed on the first observing proposal was: Nicholas Suntzeff (PI); Brian Schmidt (Co-I); (other Co-Is) R. Chris Smith, Robert Schommer, Mark M. Phillips, Mario Hamuy, Roberto Aviles, Jose Maza, Adam Riess, Robert Kirshner, Jason Spiromilio, and Bruno Leibundgut. The original project was awarded four nights of telescope time on the CTIO Víctor M. Blanco Telescope on the nights of February 25, 1995, and March 6, 24, and 29, 1995. The pilot project led to the discovery of supernova SN1995Y. In 1995, the HZT elected Brian P. Schmidt of the Mount Stromlo Observatory which is part of the Australian National University to manage the team.

The team expanded to roughly 20 astronomers located in the United States, Europe, Australia, and Chile. They used the Víctor M. Blanco telescope to discover Type Ia supernovae out to redshifts of z = 0.9. The discoveries were verified with spectra taken mostly from the telescopes of the Keck Observatory, and the European Southern Observatory.

In a 1998 study led by Adam Riess, the High-Z Team became the first to publish evidence that the expansion of the Universe is accelerating (Riess et al. 1998, AJ, 116, 1009, submitted March 13, 1998, accepted May 1998). The team later spawned Project ESSENCE led by Christopher Stubbs of Harvard University and the Higher-Z Team led by Adam Riess of Johns Hopkins University and Space Telescope Science Institute.

In 2011, Riess and Schmidt, along with Saul Perlmutter of the Supernova Cosmology Project, were awarded the Nobel Prize in Physics for this work.

Awards
1998: Breakthrough of the Year, Science magazine
2006: Shaw Prize
2007: Gruber Prize in Cosmology
2011: Nobel Prize in Physics 
2011: Albert Einstein Medal
2015: Breakthrough Prize in Fundamental Physics
2015: Wolf Prize in Physics

Members
Mount Stromlo Observatory and the Australian National University
Brian P. Schmidt
CTIO
Nicholas Suntzeff
Robert Schommer
R. Chris Smith
Mario Hamuy (1994–1997)
Las Campanas Observatory
Mark M. Phillips (1994–2000)
Pontificia Universidad Católica de Chile
Alejandro Clocchiatti (starting in 1996)
University of Chile
Jose Maza (1994–1997)
European Southern Observatory
Bruno Leibundgut
Jason Spyromilio
University of Hawaii
John Tonry (starting in 1996)
University of California, Berkeley
Alexei Filippenko (starting in 1996)
Weidong Li (starting in 1999)
Space Telescope Science Institute
Adam Riess
Ron Gilliland (1996–2000)
University of Washington
Christopher Stubbs (starting in 1995)
Craig Hogan (starting in 1995)
David Reiss (1995–1999)
Alan Diercks (1995–1999)
Harvard University
Christopher Stubbs (starting in 2003)
Robert Kirshner
Thomas Matheson (starting 1999)
Saurabh Jha (starting 1997)
Peter Challis
University of Notre Dame
Peter Garnavich
Stephen Holland (starting 2000)

References

External links
High-Z Supernova Search Team Mainsite

International research institutes
Physical cosmology